Guillermo Durán and Andrés Molteni were the defending champions, but Durán chose not to participate and Molteni chose to compete in Båstad instead.

Robin Haase and Matwé Middelkoop won the title, defeating Roman Jebavý and Jiří Veselý in the final, 6–4, 6–4.

Seeds

Draw

Draw

References
 Main Draw

Croatia Open Umag - Doubles